Efimeris was a Greek language newspaper published in Vienna from 1790 to 1797. It is the oldest Greek newspaper of which issues have survived till today.

History
In 1790, the Greek typographers Poulios Markidis-Pouliou and Georgios Markidis-Pouliou, from Siatista, started publishing the newspaper in the Greek, Serbo-Croatian ("Illyrian") and German languages, after successfully negotiating a license from the Austrian authorities. Vienna, the Austrian capital, was at that time an important commercial center for Greek merchants. The newspaper published the Declaration of the Rights of Man and of the Citizen in serials, as well as several works by Rigas Feraios. The newspaper's run lasted until 1797, when Georgios Pouliou was arrested along with Rigas Feraios for their publication of "revolutionary and godless" works, and the paper was shut down in January 1798.

Many of its original issues can be seen in various public libraries in Greece, and in 2000, the Academy of Athens reprinted a collected edition of the newspaper.

References

Sources
 

Defunct newspapers published in Greece
Modern Greek Enlightenment
Modern Greek literature
History of Vienna
Rigas Feraios